Washington's 39th legislative district is one of forty-nine districts in Washington state for representation in the state legislature. The rural district contains most of Snohomish and Skagit counties and the northeastern corner of King County. 

This district's legislators are state senator Keith Wagoner and state representatives Sam Low (position 1) and Carolyn Eslick (position 2), all Republicans.

See also
Washington Redistricting Commission
Washington State Legislature
Washington State Senate
Washington House of Representatives
Washington (state) legislative districts

References

External links
Washington State Redistricting Commission
Washington House of Representatives
Map of Legislative Districts

39
Snohomish County, Washington
Skagit County, Washington
King County, Washington